Intxaurrondo is a railway station in San Sebastián, Basque Country, Spain. It is owned by Euskal Trenbide Sarea and operated by Euskotren. It lies on the San Sebastián-Hendaye railway, popularly known as the Topo line. The Cercanías San Sebastián station  serves the same area, but is unrelated to the Euskotren station.

History 
The current station is part of the new alignment between Loiola and Herrera that opened in October 2012. The original single-track tunnel was replaced by a new double-tracked one, and the underground Intxaurrondo station was built.

Services 
The station is served by Euskotren Trena lines E2 and E5. Line E2 runs every 15 minutes during weekdays and weekend afternoons, and every 30 minutes on weekend mornings. Line E5 serves the  branch, running every 15 minutes on weekdays and weekend afternoons, and every 30 minutes on weekend mornings.

References

External links
 

Euskotren Trena stations
Railway stations in San Sebastián
Railway stations in Spain opened in 2012
2012 establishments in the Basque Country (autonomous community)